Leuconitocris obereoides is a species of beetle in the family Cerambycidae. It was described by Stephan von Breuning in 1956.

Subspecies
 Dirphya obereoides obereoides (Breuning, 1956)
 Dirphya obereoides zambicola Téocchi, Jiroux & Sudre, 2004

References

Leuconitocris
Beetles described in 1956